Wasagamack First Nation (Oji-cree: ᐗᓴᑲᒪᐣᐠ, meaning: At the Bay) is an Oji-Cree First Nation band government in Manitoba, Canada. As of December 2014 the registered population of the Wasagamack First Nation was 2,017, of which 1,823 lived on their own reserve.
 
The population of Wasagamack in 2011 was 1,411 an increase of 21.6% from the 2006 population of 1,160. St. Theresa Point First Nation lies just to the south of this reserve.

Historically, the peoples of Wasagamack First Nation were part of the Island Lake Band of "Cree", which also included the nearby First Nations of Garden Hill, St. Theresa Point and Red Sucker Lake. They are a signatory to the 1909 adhesion to Treaty 5.

Reserves
The Wasagamack First Nation have reserved for themselves three Indian Reserves:
  Feather Rapids Indian Reserve, located on the north shore of Pelican Lake
  Naytawunkank Indian Reserve, located on the south shore of Bigstone Lake
  Wasagamack Indian Reserve, located on the west shore of Island Lake and containing their main community of Wasagamack

Governance
The First Nation elects their officials through the Custom Electoral System. Their council consists of a Chief and 6 councillors.

The First Nation maintains political affiliations are with the Island Lake Tribal Council (ILTC), Manitoba Keewatinohk Okimahkanak (MKO), Assembly of Manitoba Chiefs (AMC) and Indian and Northern Affairs Canada (INAC).

Services
Government
The Wasagamack First Nation administers the following programs: 
 aboriginal healing foundation
 airport project
 capital projects
 community outreach program
 economic development
 housing
 justice
 operations and maintenance
 policing
 recreation
 sanitation services
 social assistance
 television and radio broadcasting
 water and sewage services
 youth services

Educational
Educational services are administered by the Wasagamack Education Authority. The education authority oversees the everyday operation of the local school and manages other programs such as adult education program and other post-secondary funding services.
 George Knott School—nursery to grade twelve. There are over 500 students enrolled. There is one main building and several portable classrooms.

Religious
Both Midewiwin and Christianity are observed in the community. There are three church denominations in the community: a Roman Catholic Church, a United Church and a Full Gospel/Pentecostal Church.

Notable peoples
 J.J. Harper, former Chief of Wasagamack.

References

External links

 Community web page
 AANDC profile
 Map of Wasagmack at Statcan

Island Lake Tribal Council
Oji-Cree
First Nations in Northern Region, Manitoba